Blocco Nazionale is Italian for "National Bloc" and may refer to:

 National Bloc (Italy, 1921), an electoral alliance composed of Liberals, Fascists, Nationalists and Social Democrats
 National Bloc (Italy, 1948), an electoral alliance formed by the Italian Liberal Party and the Common Man's Front
 National Bloc of Freedom, an Italian political coalition of monarchist parties

See also 
 National Bloc (disambiguation)